Ittihad Town is a neighbourhood in the Karachi West district of Karachi, Pakistan, Located in Baldia Town  since Population.

Demography 
There are several ethnic groups in Ittehad Town including, Families Tanoli Khan's, Sindhis, Kashmiris, Seraikis, Pakhtuns, Balochis, Brahuis, Hazaras, Khattaks, Hindko,  and Punjabis

Recent Elections appeared to be Ruling party of PML-N Haji Sualeheen Tanoli,(Raja Mansha) and his associate Ajaz Noor Khattak, Raja Akram, Irshad Alam and Syed Basharat. Many of people are here since 1987.

References

External links 
 Karachi Website .

Neighbourhoods of Karachi
Baldia Town